My Little Pony: Equestria Girls (or simply Equestria Girls) is an animated spin-off franchise based on the children's television series My Little Pony: Friendship Is Magic, which in turn is based on the My Little Pony toyline created by American toy and game manufacturer Hasbro. Much like Friendship Is Magic, the franchise also has musical elements, featuring songs performed onscreen by its characters in the movies and other media.

Overall, as of 2019, the spin-off franchise has featured over 50 original songs.

Equestria Girls

Feature movies

Equestria Girls (2013)

1In the case of several characters providing lead vocals, the performers are listed in the order in which their characters (of the first of their characters in case they voice several) start singing.3The singer is not portraying a character.4As the song only features several characters singing in harmony, there are no lead vocals per se.

Rainbow Rocks (2014)

1In the case of several characters providing lead vocals, the performers are listed in the order in which their characters (of the first of their characters in case they voice several) start singing.7 This song starts before "Rainbooms Battle", and continues after it; the two are performed as one song but are credited as two separate songs.

Friendship Games (2015)

1In the case of several characters providing lead vocals, the performers are listed in the order in which their characters (of the first of their characters in case they voice several) start singing.

Legend of Everfree (2016) 

1In the case of several characters providing lead vocals, the performers are listed in the order in which their characters (of the first of their characters in case they voice several) start singing.4As the song only features several characters singing in harmony, there are no lead vocals.

Specials

Dance Magic (2017)

Forgotten Friendship (2018)

Rollercoaster of Friendship (2018)

Spring Breakdown (2019)

Sunset's Backstage Pass (2019)

Summertime Shorts (2017)

Web series

Season 1 (2017-18)

Season 2 (2019-20)
The show's second season is expected to have "ten original songs and six music videos."

Other

1In the case of several characters providing lead vocals, the performers are listed in the order in which their characters (of the first of their characters in case they voice several) start singing.3The singer is not portraying a character.

Discography

Soundtrack albums

Compilation albums

References

My Little Pony: Equestria Girls
Lists of songs by media franchise